Ayrshire was a county constituency of the House of Commons of the Parliament of Great Britain from 1708 to 1800 and of the House of Commons of the Parliament of the United Kingdom from 1801 until 1868, when it was divided into North Ayrshire and South Ayrshire.

It elected one Member of Parliament (MP), using the first-past-the-post voting system.

Creation
The British parliamentary constituency was created in 1708 following the Acts of Union 1707 and replaced the former Parliament of Scotland shire constituency of Ayrshire.

Boundaries
The Ayrshire constituency represented the county of Ayrshire, minus the parliamentary burghs of Ayr and Irvine, which were components of the Ayr Burghs constituency.

History
The constituency elected one Member of Parliament (MP) by the first past the post system until it was divided into North Ayrshire and South Ayrshire for the 1868 general election.

Members of Parliament

Election results

Elections in the 1830s

Oswald's resignation caused a by-election.

Dunlop's death caused a by-election.

Elections in the 1840s

Carr-Boyle succeeded to the peerage, becoming 5th Earl of Glasgow and causing a by-election.

Elections in the 1850s

Blair's death caused a by-election.

Crichton-Stuart's death caused a by-election.

Elections in the 1860s

References

See also
 Former United Kingdom Parliament constituencies

Historic parliamentary constituencies in Scotland (Westminster)
Constituencies of the Parliament of the United Kingdom established in 1708
Constituencies of the Parliament of the United Kingdom disestablished in 1868
Politics of Ayrshire